The  is a sake (rice wine) matsuri festival held annually in Saijō Higashihiroshima, Hiroshima Prefecture, Japan.

In July 1995, Saijō was made the home of the Brewery Laboratory of the National Tax Office.

The Saijō Sake Matsuri is an important part of Hiroshima culture, which draws crowds of between 100,000–200,000 revelers and sake connoisseurs each October before the brewing season (October–March) begins. Visitors also enjoy numerous attractions, sidestalls and games. There is also a wide variety of traditional as well as modern carnival food available.

References

External links

Tourist attractions in Hiroshima
October events
Autumn festivals
Wine festivals
Annual events in Japan
Autumn events in Japan
Festivals in Hiroshima Prefecture